Léa Le Garrec (born 9 July 1993 in Dreux) is a French football player who currently plays for French club FC Fleury 91 of the Division 1 Féminine. Le Garrec plays as a midfielder and has been active with the France women's national football team on the youth circuit. She was a member of the women's under-19 team that won the 2010 UEFA Women's Under-19 Championship. Le Garrec scored two goals in the competition. She joined Paris Saint-Germain for the 2010–11 Division 1 Féminine season.

References

External links
 
 
 

1993 births
Living people
French women's footballers
Sportspeople from Dreux
French expatriate sportspeople in England
Expatriate women's footballers in England
Paris Saint-Germain Féminine players
En Avant Guingamp (women) players
Division 1 Féminine players
Women's association football midfielders
France women's youth international footballers
France women's international footballers
Brighton & Hove Albion W.F.C. players
FC Fleury 91 (women) players
Footballers from Centre-Val de Loire